Klemzig Interchange (previously known as Klemzig station) is a bus interchange operated by Adelaide Metro in Klemzig, South Australia as part of the O-Bahn Busway.

History
Klemzig Interchange was built as part of Stage 1 of the O-Bahn Busway to Paradise Interchange. It was officially opened on 2 March 1986 by Premier John Bannon, with services commencing on 9 March. It is the first stop on the route, being located three kilometres from the Adelaide city centre on the eastern side of OG Road.

Klemzig Interchange was built to serve passengers connecting with the Circle Line bus service, which follows the Adelaide outer ring route. Many bus services bypass Klemzig and the station has limited capacity, being the smallest of the three busway stations on the O-Bahn, and the only one to not have buses leave the busway in revenue service until the introduction of services via the O-Bahn to Oakden. It is served by 29 routes.

References

External links

Adelaide O-Bahn
Bus stations in Australia
Transport infrastructure completed in 1986
Transport buildings and structures in South Australia

 real time website